Antonietta janthina is a colourful species of sea slug or aeolid nudibranch, a marine gastropod mollusc in the family Facelinidae.

Distribution
This nudibranch is known from south-east Japan. A similarly coloured species is found in Indonesia, the Philippines and Thailand.

Description
Antonietta janthina has a pink-purple body with white surface pigment. The numerous cerata have purple digestive gland inside them and superficial white or pale yellow pigment covering the tips. The oral tentacles are bright yellow and there is a median band of the same colour on the head. The rhinophores are orange with a median band of white. This species can reach a total length of at least 10 mm.

References

Facelinidae
Gastropods described in 1977